Xiaodong Sheng (born 19 January 1998) is a Chinese-born Canadian badminton player. At the age of 13, Sheng entered the Tianjin provincial team, and selected to join the Chinese national youth team in 2011. At the 2013 Chinese National Junior Championships, he clinched two titles, by winning the boys' singles and doubles event. After retiring from the national youth team, Sheng entered Kawasaki International Badminton Club trained by Li Mao. In his career, he won four international titles, namely Giraldilla International in 2018, Silicon Valley and India International Challenge in 2019, and Iran Fajr International in 2020.

Achievements

BWF International Challenge/Series (4 titles, 1 runner-up) 
Men's singles

  BWF International Challenge tournament
  BWF International Series tournament
  BWF Future Series tournament

References

External links 

Living people
1998 births
Badminton players from Tianjin
Chinese male badminton players
Canadian male badminton players
Chinese emigrants to Canada
Naturalized citizens of Canada
Canadian sportspeople of Chinese descent